Abell 36 is a planetary nebula located 780 light years away in the constellation of Virgo.

References

External links
 
 ESO Press Release from 22 January 2019

Abell 36
36
Virgo (constellation)